The 1995 Philadelphia mayoral election saw the reelection of Democrat Ed Rendell.

Election results

References

Philadelphia
1990s in Philadelphia
1995 Pennsylvania elections
1995